Staavia is a genus of flowering plants belonging to the family Bruniaceae.

It is native to the Cape Provinces in the South African Republic.

The genus name of Staavia is in honour of Martin Staaf (1731–1788), a correspondent with Carl Linnaeus, in Gothenburg. 
It was first described and published in Observ. Bot. on page 15 in 1787.

Knowns species
According to Kew:
Staavia brownii 
Staavia capitella 
Staavia dodii 
Staavia glutinosa 
Staavia phylicoides 
Staavia pinifolia 
Staavia radiata 
Staavia staavioides 
Staavia trichotoma 
Staavia verticillata 
Staavia zeyheri

References

Bruniaceae
Asterid genera
Plants described in 1787
Flora of the Cape Provinces